Associazione Calcio Milan are an Italian professional football club based in Milan, Lombardy, who currently play in the Serie A. This list details Milan's achievements in major competitions, together with the top scorers for each season.

The club has won the Scudetto nineteen times, the Coppa Italia five times, the Supercoppa Italiana seven times, the European Cup seven times, the Cup Winners' Cup twice and the European Super Cup a record five times.

History 
Milan were formed in 1899. In 1901, in only their second season, they won their first title. Two more followed in 1906 and 1907; this was their last success until the 1950–51 season, when they regained the league title after 44 years.

The club first participated in official European competitions during the 1955–56 season, entering the inaugural edition of the European Cup, a trophy that they won for the first time seven years later, in 1963. They kept proving successful during the 1960s, as they won their first Coppa Italia in 1967, their first Cup Winners' Cup the following year and their first Intercontinental Cup in 1969.

In the 1979–80 season, Milan got relegated for the first time in their history, following a match-fixing scandal. By the end of the 1980s, the club had managed to become successful again and, in the 1991–92 season, they went on to win the championship unbeaten (a feature that was never achieved before in Serie A). This was the first of three straight titles, and in the 1993–94 season, they also recorded their first European Double.

Key 

Key to league record:
Pld = Matches played
W = Matches won
D = Matches drawn
L = Matches lost
GF = Goals for
GA = Goals against
Pts = Points
Pos = Final position

Key to divisions:
Serie A = Serie A
Serie B = Serie B
Fed = Campionato Federale
Cat 1 = Prima Categoria
Div 1 = Prima Divisione
Div N = Divisione Nazionale
Reg = Regional qualifiers

Key to rounds:
DNE = Did not enter
Grp = Group stage
R1 = First round
R2 = Second round
R32 = Round of 32

R16 = Round of 16
QF = Quarter-finals
SF = Semi-finals
RU = Runners-up
W = Winners

Division shown in bold to indicate a change in division.
Top scorers shown in bold are players who were also top scorers in their division that season.

Seasons

Achievements
 Doubles:
 Serie A and UEFA Cup Winners' Cup: 1
 1967–68 season
 Coppa Italia and Cup Winners' Cup: 1
 1972–73 season
 Serie A and UEFA Champions League: 1
 1993–94 season
 Coppa Italia and UEFA Champions League: 1
 2002–03 season

Notes 
A.  Before the establishment of the modern Serie A in 1929, the championship was contested under several different formats, including knock-out competitions or successive group stages.

B.  The Coppa Italia was founded in 1922, but – despite an abortive attempt in 1927 – a second edition did not take place before the 1935–36 season. Since then the tournament was played on a regular basis until 1943, when it was suspended due to World War II. The competition was eventually resumed only in 1958.

C.  Goals in all official competitions (league, domestic cup, European and others) are counted.

D.  After winning a double tie-breaker against Juventus (0–0 aet and 2–0 by forfeit).

E.  Milan, along with other major clubs, did not enter the league in 1908 due to a dispute with the Italian FA over the use of foreign players.

F.  The championship was suspended when the First World War broke out, with the last round still to play. Despite this, in 1919, the Italian FA decided to officialize the results and awarded the title to Genoa.

G.  The tournament was abandoned, due to lack of available dates. Milan were scheduled to play against Juventus in the fourth round.

H.  Joint top scorer with Héctor Puricelli of Bologna.

I.  19 goals in the league.

J.  24 goals in the league.

K.  22 goals in the league.

L.  After winning a double tie-breaker against Brescia (1–1 aet and 2–1 aet) to qualify for the final round.

M.  34 goals in the league.

N.  26 goals in the league.

O.  The 1958 Coppa Italia started in the 1957–58 season, but was not completed before September, thus being officially awarded during the 1958–59 season.

P.  In the first three editions of the Friendship Cup, the final standing was by nations, rather than by clubs.

Q.  Joint top scorer with Aurelio Milani of Fiorentina.

R.  15 goals in the league.

S.  Joint top scorer with Paolo Pulici of Torino and Giuseppe Savoldi of Bologna.

T.  17 goals in the league.

U.  Milan were relegated due to involvement in a match-fixing scandal.

V.  After winning a tie-breaker against Sampdoria (1–0 aet) to get a UEFA Cup spot.

W.  Milan received a one-year ban from UEFA competitions due to unsporting behaviour.

X.  25 goals in the league.

Y.  Milan were inflicted a 30 points deduction at the end of the 2005–06 season and an 8 points deduction at the start of the 2006–07 season, due to alleged involvement in the 2006 match-fixing scandal.

Z.  28 goals in the league.

References 
General

Specific

External links 
A.C. Milan seasons at MagliaRossonera.it 

Seasons
 
Milan
Seasons